Kippa-Ring railway station is the terminus of the Redcliffe Peninsula railway line and serves the suburb of Kippa-Ring in Moreton Bay Region, Queensland, Australia. It features a park & ride facility and local bus stops. A stabling facility, capable of holding 10 six car trains, is located to the west of the station. It opened, together with the rail line, on 4 October 2016.

Following an upgrade Kippa-Ring railway station's car park, the station now has 408 parking spaces, consisting of 396 normal parking spaces, two new family parking spaces, and ten disability parking spaces, eight are located near the grassed area at the entrance to the station, with two of the originally installed spaces still available, with the rest being replaces by the two family parking spots and seven regular parking spots.

Services
Kippa-Ring is served by trains operating to Roma Street and Springfield Central. Some afternoon weekday services continue to Ipswich.

Services by platform

Transport links
Hornibrook Bus Lines operate six routes via Kippa-Ring station:
680: Redcliffe to Chermside bus station
690: Redcliffe to Sandgate
694: to Redcliffe via Clontarf
696: to Redcliffe via Woody Point
698: to Rothwell station
699: to Redcliffe via Scarborough

Kangaroo Bus Lines operates one route to and from Kippa-Ring station:
660: to Caboolture station

References

Railway stations in Australia opened in 2016
Railway stations in Moreton Bay Region